is a professional Japanese baseball player. He is a pitcher for the Hanshin Tigers of Nippon Professional Baseball (NPB).

References 

1999 births
Living people
Baseball people from Saitama Prefecture
Nippon Professional Baseball pitchers
Hanshin Tigers players